Beethoven's cello sonatas may refer to:

Cello Sonatas Nos. 1 and 2 (Beethoven)
Cello Sonata No. 3 (Beethoven)
Cello Sonatas Nos. 4 and 5 (Beethoven)